Końskie Synagogue located in the Polish city of Końskie was built in 1780. It was one of the first large synagogues of its kind built in Poland at the invitation of the King of Poland. A large, wooden synagogue noted for its architectural style, it was burned to the ground by the German occupying authorities in September 1939, soon after their conquest of the town.

Wooden synagogues
Former synagogues in Poland
17th-century synagogues
Końskie County
Buildings and structures in Świętokrzyskie Voivodeship
Wooden buildings and structures in Poland
Synagogues in Poland destroyed by Nazi Germany